Diven (also Romanized as Dīven) is a village in Osmanvand Rural District, Firuzabad District, Kermanshah County, Kermanshah Province, Iran. At the 2006 census, its population was 140, in 29 families.

References 

Diven

Populated places in Kermanshah County